Verses of Comfort, Assurance & Salvation is the debut studio album of American indie pop band Au Revoir Simone. It was originally released on March 23, 2005, on the trio's own Our Secret Record Company label; it was subsequently issued in Europe on October 31 by Moshi Moshi Records, and later by the Rallye Label in Japan.

The band members recorded the album in a basement shower stall that belonged to their manager, Rod Sherwood, who converted the stall into a vocal booth with the aid of a few handy quilts. "Through the Backyards" was the first track to be released as a single, which was included on David Byrne's web-based radio station.

Track listing
 "Through the Backyards" – 3:54
 "Hurricanes" – 3:46
 "The Disco Song" – 2:19
 "Where You Go" – 2:41
 "Back in Time" – 5:18
 "The Winter Song" – 2:52
 "And Sleep Al Mar" – 3:53
 "Stay Golden" – 2:48

References

External links
Official Au Revoir Simone website
Official Moshi Moshi Records website

2005 debut albums
Au Revoir Simone albums
Moshi Moshi Records albums